is a Japanese professional footballer who plays as a winger or an attacking midfielder for Sagan Tosu, on loan from Cerezo Osaka.

References

External links

2002 births
Living people
People from Kawasaki, Kanagawa
Association football people from Kanagawa Prefecture
Association football midfielders
Japanese footballers
Japan youth international footballers
Yokohama F. Marinos players
Cerezo Osaka players
Sagan Tosu players
J1 League players
J3 League players
Japan under-20 international footballers